In grammar and theoretical linguistics, government or rection refers to the relationship between a word and its dependents. One can discern between at least three concepts of government: the traditional notion of case government, the highly specialized definition of government in some generative models of syntax, and a much broader notion in dependency grammars.

Traditional case government

In traditional Latin and Greek (and other) grammars, government is the control by verbs and prepositions of the selection of grammatical features of other words. Most commonly, a verb or preposition is said to "govern" a specific grammatical case if its complement must take that case in a grammatically correct structure (see: case government). For example, in Latin, most transitive verbs require their direct object to appear in the accusative case, while the dative case is reserved for indirect objects. Thus, the phrase I see you would be rendered as Te video in Latin, using the accusative form te for the second person pronoun, and I give a present to you would be rendered as Tibi donum do, using both an accusative (donum) for the direct  and a dative (tibi; the dative of the second person pronoun) for the indirect object; the phrase I help you, however, would be rendered as Tibi faveo, using only the dative form tibi. The verb favere (to help), like many others, is an exception to this default government pattern: its one and only object must be in the dative. Although no direct object in the accusative is controlled by the specific verb, this object is traditionally considered to be an indirect one, mainly because passivization is unavailable except perhaps in an impersonal manner and for certain verbs of this type. A semantic alternation may also be achieved when different case constructions are available with a verb: Id credo (id is an accusative) means I believe this, I have this opinion and Ei credo (ei is a dative) means I trust this, I confide in this.

Prepositions (and postpositions and circumpositions, i.e. adpositions) are like verbs in their ability to govern the case of their complement, and like many verbs, many adpositions can govern more than one case, with distinct interpretations. For example in Italy would be in Italia, Italia being an ablative case form, but towards Italy would be in Italiam, Italiam being an accusative case form.

In government and binding theory
The abstract syntactic relation of government in government and binding theory, a phrase structure grammar, is an extension of the traditional notion of case government. Verbs govern their objects, and more generally, heads govern their dependents. A governs B if and only if:
 A is a governor (a lexical head),
 A m-commands B, and
 no barrier intervenes between A and B.

This definition is explained in more detail in the government section of the article on government and binding theory.

Government broadly construed
One sometimes encounters definitions of government that are much broader than the one just produced. Government is understood as the property that regulates which words can or must appear with the referenced word. This broader understanding of government is part of many dependency grammars. The notion is that many individual words in a given sentence can appear only by virtue of the fact that some other word appears in that sentence.

According to this definition, government occurs between any two words connected by a dependency, the dominant word opening slots for subordinate words. The dominant word is the governor, and the subordinates are its governees. The following dependency tree illustrates governors and governees:

The word has governs Fred and ordered; in other words, has is governor over its governees Fred and ordered. Similarly, ordered governs dish and for, that is, ordered is governor over its governees dish and for; Etc. This understanding of government is widespread among dependency grammars.

Governors vs. heads
The distinction between the terms governor and head is a source of confusion, given the definitions of government produced above. Indeed, governor and head are overlapping concepts. The governor and the head of a given word will often be one and the same other word. The understanding of these concepts becomes difficult, however,  when discontinuities are involved. The following example of a w-fronting discontinuity from German illustrates the difficulty:

Two of the criteria mentioned above for identifying governors (and governees) are applicable to the interrogative pronoun wem 'whom'. This pronoun receives dative case from the verb geholfen 'helped' (= case government) and it can appear by virtue of the fact that geholfen appears (= licensing). Given these observations, one can make a strong argument that geholfen is the governor of wem, even though the two words are separated from each other by the rest of the sentence. In such constellations, one sometimes distinguishes between head and governor. So while the governor of wem is geholfen, the head of wem is taken to be the finite verb denkst 'think'. In other words, when a discontinuity occurs, one assumes that the governor and the head (of the relevant word) are distinct, otherwise they are the same word. Exactly how the terms head and governor are used can depend on the particular theory of syntax that is employed.

See also
 Agreement (linguistics)
 C-command
 Case government
 Collocation
 Dependency grammar
 M-command
 Phrase structure grammar

Notes

References
Allerton, D. 1979. Essentials of grammatical theory. London: Routledge & Kegan Paul.
Aoun, J. and D. Sportiche 1983. On the formal theory of government. Linguistic Review 2, 211–236.
Burton-Roberts, N. 1986. Analysing sentences: An introduction to English syntax. London: Longman.
Chomsky, N. 1986. Barriers. Cambridge, MA: MIT Press.
Engel, U. 1994. Syntax der deutschen Gegenwartssprache, 3rd revised edition. Berlin: Erich Schmidt.
Groß, T. and T. Osborne 2009. Toward a practical dependency grammar theory of discontinuities. SKY Journal of Linguistics 22, 43–90.
Harris, C. L. and Bates, E. A. 2002. Clausal backgrounding and pronominal reference: A functionalist approach to c-command. Language and Cognitive Processes 17, 3, 237–269.
Jung, W.-Y. 1995. Syntaktische Relationen im Rahmen der Dependenzgrammatik. Hamburg: Buske.
Lockwood, D. 2002. Syntactic analysis and description: A constructional approach. London: continuum.
Ouhalla, J. 1994. Transformational grammar: From rules to principles and parameters. London: Edward Arnold.
Reinhart, T. 1976. The syntactic domain of anaphora. Doctoral dissertation, MIT. (Available online at http://dspace.mit.edu/handle/1721.1/16400).
Starosta, S. 1988. The case for Lexicase: An outline of Lexicase grammatical theory. New York: Pinter Publishers.
Tesnière, L. 1959. Éléments de syntaxe structurale. Paris: Klincksieck.
van Riemsdijk, H. and E. Williams. 1986. Introduction to the theory of grammar. Cambridge, MA: The MIT Press.
Wardbaugh, R. 2003. Understanding English grammar, second edition. Malden, MA: Blackwell Publishing.

Generative syntax
Syntactic relationships
Syntax